Artemisio is a village and a former municipality in Euboea, Greece. Since the 2011 local government reform it is part of the municipality Istiaia-Aidipsos, of which it is a municipal unit. The municipal unit has an area of 122.640 km2. Population 3,712 (2011).

References

Populated places in Euboea